Dziećmarów  is a village in Opole Voivodeship, Głubczyce County, Gmina Baborów.

Population

External links 
 Parish website
 Interview about Dziećmarów in local radiostation

Villages in Głubczyce County